Monster Worldwide, Inc. is an American provider of employment services,  the largest of which is Monster.com. Through online media sites and services, the company  delivers targeted audiences to advertisers. In 2010, these operating segments represented approximately 46%, 40% and 14% of its consolidated revenue, respectively. On August 24, 2010, Monster completed the acquisition of Yahoo! HotJobs from Yahoo!. On December 31, 2010, the Company completed the acquisition of JobBusan, a business that provides online recruiting in Busan, South Korea.

In August 2016, Ranstad Holding, a Dutch multinational human resource consulting firm headquartered in Diemen, Netherlands announced acquisition of Monster Worldwide.

Option backdating
James J. Treacy, who served as  president and CEO of Monster, was charged of conspiring with other officers of the company to systematically backdate option grants over a period from 1997 to 2003. He was found guilty by a jury in May 2009 in the United States District Court for the Southern District of New York.

References

External links

 

Randstad NV
American companies established in 1999
Business services companies established in 1999
Companies based in New York City
Companies formerly listed on the Nasdaq
Companies formerly listed on the New York Stock Exchange
American subsidiaries of foreign companies
2016 mergers and acquisitions
2000 initial public offerings
Monster.com